Ecotrophology is a branch of nutritional science concerned with everyday practice. It is mainly in Germany that it is seen as a separate branch of health care, and the word is rare outside Germany. 

Ecotrophologists are specialists in nutrition, household management and economics. This includes physiological, economic and technological principles of healthy nutrition and practical application. They work in many different fields: management of the above types of operations, development of new nutritional concepts in catering, quality control in food manufacturing and processing operations and research within the food industry. Due to the interdisciplinary nature of the training, ecotrophologists often take a coordinating role in quality management in the food industry.

References

Nutritional science